Lake George is a Canadian rural community in York County, New Brunswick at the intersection of Route 635 and the northern terminus of Route 636.  The community is located 45 kilometres (km) west of the city of Fredericton, and is named after Lake George.

Although Lake George has some year-round residents who live and work in the community or the nearby village of Harvey Station, its population increases substantially during the summer months when seasonal cottages are occupied.

History

Notable people

See also
List of communities in New Brunswick

References

External links

Communities in York County, New Brunswick